RELC Journal is a triannual peer-reviewed academic journal that covers the field of language learning. It was established in 1970 and is currently published by SAGE Publications on behalf of the Regional Language Centre (RELC) of the Southeast Asian Ministers of Education Organization (SEAMEO). The journal's editors-in-chief are Graeme Cane, Alvin Pang, and Marie Alina Yeo (SEAMEO RELC, Singapore).

Abstracting and indexing 
RELC Journal is abstracted and indexed in:
 Academic Complete
 Academic Premier
 Scopus
 ZETOC

External links 
 
 SEAMEO

SAGE Publishing academic journals
English-language journals
Linguistics journals
Publications established in 1970
Triannual journals